Aspidodiadema tonsum is a species of sea urchin of the family Aspidodiadematidae. Their armour is covered with spines. It is placed in the genus Aspidodiadema and lives in the sea. Aspidodiadema tonsum was first scientifically described in 1879 by Alexander Emanuel Agassiz.

References 

tonsum
Animals described in 1879